Natural luge tracks are tracks that are used for naturbahn (from the German "natural track") luge competitions. Tracks are often located along mountain roads and paths. The track surface is made of packed snow and ice, with a slope of not more than 15%. Unlike its Olympic counterpart "kunstbahn" (artificial track) luge, natural tracks are to be adapted to the natural conditions and artificial refrigeration and banked curves are not permitted.

Natural tracks are partly built on existing paths, but also on specially created areas and must of course be adapted to the given terrain. They are delimited with wooden bands, plastic walls or foam mats and only prepared with snow and water (ice). In contrast to the artificial tracks, they must not be raised.
The natural track should have at least the following elements:
 a left turn
 a right turn
 a hairpin (left and right)
 a combination of curves
 a straight
Parallel competitions (approximately ), chase races and city races (approximately ) are held on shortened tracks. From the 2015–16 season there are trial runs (city event in Moscow, Junior World Cup Seiseralm) and parallel competitions in ski areas (for example in Kühtai / Tyrol and on the Seiseralm / Italy). Artificially excessive curves are not permitted: the curve base is to be horizontal.

More than 50 natural toboggan runs are mainly used in Italy, Austria, and Germany. In addition there are runs in Russia, Poland, Romania, Bulgaria, Finland, Sweden, Norway, the Czech Republic, Turkey, Croatia, New Zealand, Slovenia, Ukraine, Slovakia, Switzerland, France, and Liechtenstein as well as Canada and the United States.

The most well-known natural track in the United States is in Michigan, hosted by the Upper Peninsula Luge Club. Canada has tracks in Camrose, Hinton, Grande Prairie, and Calgary in Alberta, as well as a track at the Ontario Luge Club at the Calabogie Peaks resort.
The track in Naseby, New Zealand, is the only one in the southern hemisphere.

Below is a list of all natural luge tracks of FIL member countries.

References 

FIL-Luge.org information on the different tracks used.
FIL-Luge.org list of natural luge tracks.
List of natural luge tracks at sport-komplett 

Bobsleigh, luge, and skeleton tracks
Natural luge tracks
Natural track luge